The 2004 Liga Super also known as the Dunhill Liga Super, is the inaugural season of the Liga Super, the new top-tier professional football league in Malaysia.

The season was held from 14 February and concluded on 14 August 2004. This league participated by 8 teams, six west teams and two east teams, Sabah and Sarawak. The Liga Super champions for 2004 was Pahang.

Pahang dominated the season and ended up winning the title by a wide margin and this was down to their efforts in securing the services of the nation's top players prior to the start of the new season. Pahang's Indra Putra Mahayuddin was the season's top goalscorer with 15 goals. He held the record as the only local players which won the accolade until the end of 2009 season.

The highest scoring match of the season was Perlis 6–2 defeat of Kedah on 31 July 2004.

A plus point was the surprisingly strong finish of club side Public Bank. At this time, the Football Association of Malaysia were trying to promote clubs as the future of Malaysian football.

Stadium and locations

League table

Season statistics

Top scorers

References

Malaysia Super League seasons
1
Malaysia
Malaysia